The Canberra Institute of Technology (CIT) is a vocational education provider in Australia's capital city Canberra, the city is located at the northern end of the Australian Capital Territory. CIT is the largest Technical and Further Education (TAFE) in the Australian Capital Territory. Qualifications offered by CIT range from certificate to degree level. CIT has campuses across Canberra, located in Bruce, Reid, and Fyshwick. CIT also has two learning centres in Tuggeranong Town Centre and Gungahlin which are primarily for students studying via flexible or distance learning.  CIT provides a wide range of education and training courses that focus on the skills and knowledge needed for the workplace and further study.

History

CIT was founded in 1928 as the Canberra Technical College, changed in 1975 to Canberra College of Technical and Further Education. It later merged with Bruce and Woden TAFEs. It has been a Territory Authority since 4 January 1988 under the A.C.T.  Institute of Technology and Further Education Act 1987 (now the Canberra Institute of Technology Act 1987).

Courses offered

Courses are offered in these fields:

Health and Fitness

 Aged Care
 Allied Health
 COVID-19 Infection Control
 Dental
 Disability
 Fitness
 Home and Community Care
 Message
 Nursing
 Population Health
 Sport
 Work Health and Safety

Professional

 Accounting
 Building Design
 Building Management
 Business
 Cyber Security
 Engineering
 Government
 Information Technology
 Legal
 Management and Human Resources

Professional

 Art
 Beauty
 Fashion
 Floristry
 Games and Virtual Worlds
 Graphic Design
 Hairdressing
 Live Theatre Production
 Interior Design
 Media
 Music
 Photography

Service Industry

 Baking and Patisserie
 Butchery
 Commercial Cookery
 Events
 Hospitality
 Tourism

Science and Environment

 Animal Studies
 Environmental Sciences
 Forensics
 Horticulture
 Laboratory Studies
 Renewable Energy Skills

Education and Community

 Aboriginal or Torres Strait Islander
 ACT Senior Secondary Certificate (Year 12)
 Alcohol and Other Drugs
 Children's Education and Care
 Community Services and Development
 English Language
 Foundation Skills
 Mental Health
 Teach Education
 Youth Work

Trades

 Auto Electrical
 Auto Mechanical
 Cabinet Making
 Carpentry
 Crane Licenses
 Electronics and Communications
 Electrical Trades
 Elevation Work Platform EWP License
 Forklift
 Glass and Glazing
 High Risk Licenses
 Insulation Installation
 Metal Fabrication
 Painting and Decorating
 Panel and Paint
 Personnel and Materials Hoist
 Plastering
 Plumbing
 Refrigeration and Air Conditioning
 Tiling
 White Card
 Work at Safe Heights

Qualifications include certificates I to IV, diploma and advanced diploma. Qualifications in these categories are managed by the Australian Quality Training Framework (AQTF) which is the national set of standards.

CIT is also accredited to deliver graduate certificates, graduate diplomas and bachelor's degrees. Students in these courses may be eligible to receive FEE HELP (formerly HECS) in the same way university students can.

Some courses at CIT can be undertaken via Flexible Learning where students do not have to study according to a semester-based timetable.

Student numbers
In 2009 CIT had 26,941 student enrolments. Compared with the other education institutions in the ACT (University of Canberra, Australian National University, Australian Catholic University and the University of NSW at the Australian Defence Force Academy) CIT is the largest by student numbers.

Campuses

CIT has five campuses across Canberra, in the south, centre and north of the city.

CIT Reid.
The suburb of Reid is on the edge of the Canberra city centre, with Canberra's main bus interchange. Reid campus has a student-run restaurant, child care centre, hair dressing studio, beauty salon and travel agency.

CIT Bruce.
The suburb of Bruce is in north-west Canberra. This campus is approximately 4 km from the nearest town centre (Belconnen) which includes a Westfield shopping centre, Uni-gardens CIT student accommodation and a bus interchange. Bruce campus has a student-run massage clinic and full service gym.

Fyshwick Trade Skills Centre.
CIT's campus in Fyshwick is called the Fyshwick Trade Skills Centre as it is the base for the teaching of traditional trades including automotive, metals, plumbing, electrical, refrigeration, air-conditioning and earthmoving. It is located in the suburb of Fyshwick in south-east Canberra, approximately 2 km from the central area of Fyshwick.

CIT Tuggeranong A new location for Canberra's south is now open at 205 Anketell Street, Greenway. The learning and professional development opportunities available at CIT's Tuggeranong campus have a focus on business and innovation and have been developed for new learners, existing learners, up-skillers and professionals.

All campuses have a Student Services Hub, learning centre (with library) and cafe. All but Fyshwick have book shops.

CIT and universities
CIT and the University of Canberra (UC): CIT and UC collaborate on a number of initiatives, most prominently of pathways and transfers between the two institutions. 
CIT students who complete a diploma or advanced diploma are guaranteed an offer of a place in an undergraduate degree at the University of Canberra.

In addition, over 150 formal credit transfer arrangements are in place where students can receive credit for CIT studies and reduce the number of units they need to study at UC.

CIT and the University of Canberra also form two-thirds of the collaborative organization, the National Centre for Forensic Studies, in conjunction with the Australian Federal Police. According to the National Centre for Forensic Studies' website, this partnership exists to collaborate in the design, development and delivery of undergraduate and postgraduate courses leading to academic qualifications in forensic studies.

CIT and the Australian National University (ANU): collaborate on the delivery of two associate degree programs – the Bachelor of Science and the Bachelor of Engineering, whereby students complete the first year of the degree at CIT and the second at ANU. Further, graduates automatically gain entry into a 'linked' ANU Bachelor's degree with 18 months credit.

 
CIT and Charles Sturt University (CSU) also have a number of formalized credit transfer agreements whereby graduates of CIT's Diploma / Advanced Diploma programs receive credit when they commence a linked CSU degree.

CIT and the Academy of Interactive Entertainment (AIE): CIT and AIE jointly deliver a number of programs including the Bachelor of Games and Virtual Worlds (Programming).

Awards
 2010 ACT Training Excellence Large Registered Training Organization Award for outstanding achievements in the delivery of vocational education and training.
 2010 ACT Training Excellence ACT Australian Apprentice of the Year: Ross Ingham, a Certificate III in Plumbing.
 2010 ACT Training Excellence ACT Vocational Student of the Year: Sharon Dale, an Advanced Diploma of Naturopathy student at CIT.
2014 ACT Training Excellence, ACT Large Registered Training Organization of the Year
2015 ACT Training Excellence, ACT Large Registered Training Organization of the Year
2015 ACT Vocational Student of the Year, Hanna Darmody
2015 ACT Apprentice of the Year, Supi Ma'ilei
2016 ACT Australian Apprentice of the Year, Shane Dealy
2016 Australian Training Awards, Australian Apprentice of the Year, Shane Dealy

References

External links
Canberra Institute of Technology

Australian vocational education and training providers
Technical and further education